The Honda Z50RD, also known as the Christmas Special or the Chrome Edition, is an all-chrome Honda Z series minibike released in 1986. A limited edition of the Honda Z50R, it is considered to be rare.

Specifications
The Z50RD has the same specifications as the 1986 Honda Z50R: a 49 cc single-piston engine, three-speed transmission, and drum brakes. The distinguishing feature of the Z50RD is that most of its visible parts—including the fuel tank, fenders, exhaust, forks, frame, wheels, and handlebars—are chromed. The wheel hubs, and the parts of the motor that are not chromed, are polished and clear-coated.

History
Z50RDs were manufactured in July or August 1986, and shipped to Honda dealers in December. The combined total of Z50Rs and Z50RDs shipped by Honda in 1986 was 11,652, but the total number for Z50RDs alone is unknown. Nor is it known how many dealers were allowed to purchase Z50RDs, but some collectors believe that each dealer could buy 2; there were 805 Honda dealers in the United States in the 1980s. 

The Z50RD received the nicknames "Christmas Special"—because it was shipped in December 1986, and had a decal on its fuel tank reading "Special"—and "Chrome Edition", after its extensive use of chrome. Upon its release, it did not sell quickly, but by 2016, it had become highly sought after by collectors as a rarity. The 2021 National Automobile Dealers Association guide valued a Z50RD in excellent condition at $9,385.

See also
 List of scooter manufacturers
 Minibike
 Pocketbike
 Pit bike

Note

References

Z50RD
Motorcycles introduced in 1986
Minibikes
1986 introductions